408th may refer to:

408th Armament Systems Group, inactive United States Air Force unit
408th Bombardment Squadron, inactive United States Air Force unit
408th Support Brigade (United States), support brigade of the United States Army

See also
408 (number)
408, the year 408 (CDVIII) of the Julian calendar
408 BC